Stewart Park may refer to:

 Stewart Park, Aberdeen, Scotland
 Stewart Park, Middlesbrough, England
 Stewart Park (Ithaca, New York), United States